(), also called ancient-style dress, refers to a style of Chinese costume attire which are styled or inspired by ancient Chinese clothing (typically  or ).  is typically used as stage clothes in Chinese opera and in Chinese television drama, such as in period drama which are normally set in imperial China prior to 1911, and in the  and  genre.

Chinese opera 

This form of  emerged in 1915 when new Chinese opera costumes had to be created for a new category of female role which had also been developed by Mei Lanfang. Therefore, Mei Lanfang designed new female costumes by referring to ancient Chinese sculpturesand to ancient Chinese paintings, especially women in classical Chinese scroll paintings, often based on from mythological figures. His goal was to make his costumes more elegant instead of making it look ancient.His costume designs then became known as  due to their relationship with ancient China, in particular the pre-Qing dynasty period from which his costumes designs were based.

The  designed by Mei Lanfang is characterized with fitted waist. The  developed by Mei Lanfang different from the traditional Chinese opera costumes in some aspects: the skirts were longer; the skirt was worn under the jacket to make the character look slimmer; the water sleeves were longer and wider; and the accessories were less gaudy. Other performers such as Ouyang Yuqian and Feng Zihe also contributed to the development of the  design.

Chinese television and entertainment media 
 are typically used in Chinese television drama and movies.

Relationship with film and drama genre 

The first film produced in China was Dingjun Mountain in 1905 which depicted extracted scenes from a Beijing opera play performed by Tan Xinpei. The film was based on the 70th and 71st chapters of the Romance of the Three Kingdoms. The 1920s was marked by the adaptation of traditional Chinese indigenous genre into cinema. These genres were adapted from Chinese literature and from the Chinese opera stage play as a countermovement against the prevalence of European and American film products. The Tianyi Film Company was a major studio which specialized in Chinese genres at that time; its succeeding company, the Shaw Brothers Studio in Hong Kong continued to produce indigenous Chinese genres, such as Huangmei opera films and guzhuang epics.

and  
, also known as period costume film, is indigenous genre to China and first emerged in the 1920s in China. This genre is similar to costume drama, period film, and historical film. However, by definition the term , which literally means "ancient", does not refer to films and dramas which are set in the Republic of China as the Republican period is a symbol of modernity and the end of tradition.

 are therefore depicted in period drama (i.e. historical drama, which is also called  drama) which are normally set in imperial China prior to 1911.  also typically depict adaptations of traditional Chinese folktales, plays, and popular novels. As a distinct genre, it is characterized by its focus on ancient history and historical personalities.

The origins of  genre in cinema, however, is quite recent and emerged in the 20th century.

The  genre was initiated by the Tianyi Film Companyi in 1925. In the 21st century, the  genre can be a guzhuangpian and a  movie. The  genre tends to dress its characters into .

The  genre typically involves -immortals and immortality cultivation.

Characteristics and costume design 

Most  used in the production of television dramas, movies and animations do not conform to historical facts and/or are fantasy-inspired. Some  are based on different existing historical clothing worn in different dynasties, and/or inspired by Chinese opera costumes, and murals (e.g. Dunhuang frescoes); they would sometimes have features, or have attire, added, removed, simplified, to create a desired visual impact or to meet the production needs. It is also possible for various ethnic Chinese elements to be mixed and matched when designing ; combining modern fashion elements and/or western-style clothing elements can also be done.

When designing  for films and television dramas, costumes designers consider the modern aesthetic taste of its audience while also conforming and respecting the historical reality. The  used in the  genre, for example, is based on the historical hanfu, but is modernized in terms of design resulting in the guzhuang being different from its historical version.

Characters wearing , for example, can have a colour theme which reflect his initial personality; however, this colour theme may change throughout the character development. It is also impossible for costume designers to fully restore garment and garment-related artefacts; and therefore, guzhuang designers need to innovate their costume designs based on historical facts.

List of movies, drama, and animations featuring guzhuang 
Examples of movies and dramas which uses  are: The cave of the Silken Web (1927), Luoyang bridge (1928), Dragon Inn (1967), a Chinese Ghost Story (1987), The Swordsman (1990), Swordsman II (1992) and The East Is Red (1993), Ashes of Time (1994), Hero (2002), House of Flying Daggers (2004), Curse of the golden flower (2006), The Empress of China (2014), The Journey of Flower (2015), The Princess Weiyoung (2016), Eternal Love (2017), Ruyi's Royal Love in the Palace (2018), The Untamed (2019), Mulan (2020 Film), and Word of Honour (2021), etc. Example of animations which depicts  are: Mulan (1998 film), Kungfu panda.

Literature, web-novels, and comics 

Influences and derivatives

Wei-Jin Style Hanfu 

And, some  enthusiasts also wear it instead of wearing .  is, however, also a factor of influence (among many others) to the design of modern ; for example, the design of  style  is a relatively modern design which was influenced by Chinese movies and television drama series and does not exist in history.  found in  television drama have also left a deep impact on Chinese audience. Many  fans also wear  in their everyday lives, which then promote the growing  industry.

Another -style costume which has influenced modern clothing in modern-day China is the  designed by costume designer Ye Jintian in 2001 for the role of drama female character Xiu He, played by Chinese actress Zhou Xun, in the Chinese television drama 《》(), a drama set in the Republican era of China. While basing himself on the clothing of the Qing dynasty, Ye Jintian, however, did not fully respected the historical accuracy of the dress and instead mixed several elements together from similar eras in his costume design. As the  gives a feeling of dignity and beauty to its wearer, the  designed by Ye Jintian became progressively popular and eventually became a form of traditional Chinese-style wedding dress chosen by many Chinese brides during their marriage nowadays.

See also 

 Hanfu
 Hanfu movement
 Qizhuang
 Chinese opera
 List of Chinese television series

Notes

References

External links 

 The Cave of the Silken Web (1927)

 
Performing arts
Costume design